James George Guy  (born 26 November 1995) is an English competitive swimmer who specialises in freestyle and butterfly. Guy has won gold medals 
representing Great Britain at the Olympic Games, the World and European Championships, and England in the Commonwealth Games.

Guy came to international prominence when he won two World Championship gold medals in the 200-metre freestyle and 4×200-metre freestyle relay event at the 2015 World Aquatics Championships. A prodigious relay swimmer, in 2016, he won silver in the 4x200m freestyle relay and the 4x100m medley relay at the Rio Olympics, finishing 4th in the individual 200 metre freestyle event. He helped defend the men's 4 x 200 metre freestyle relay world title in 2017, and swam the butterfly leg to help Great Britain to gold in the 4 x 100 metre medley relay at the 2019 World Aquatics Championships. Guy is a Commonwealth Games and seven-time European champion across various relay events. Guy competes in 4 x 100m freestyle, 4 x 200m freestyle, and on the butterfly legs of 4 x 100m medley relays.

In 2021, at the 2020 Summer Olympics, Guy became Olympic champion, winning gold in the 4 x 200 metres freestyle relay for Great Britain with Tom Dean, Duncan Scott, Matt Richards and Calum Jarvis. He won a second Olympic title, the inaugural mixed medley relay, with Adam Peaty, Anna Hopkin, Kathleen Dawson and Freya Anderson.

Early life
Guy was born in Bury to Cath and Andrew Guy and has a younger brother whose name is Luke Guy. Guy was educated at Forest Preparatory School, Timperley in  Trafford, Greater Manchester. When he was 13, he received a swimming scholarship to Millfield in Somerset. He was a member of Trafford Metros swimming club before he moved to Somerset.

Career
Guy won his first major medal at the 2012 European Junior Championships in Antwerp where he finished in the bronze medal position in the 400m freestyle.

In his breakthrough season in 2013, he won three medals at the World Junior Championships in Dubai, landing silver over 200m and 400m Freestyle then anchoring the British quartet to 4 × 200 m Freestyle Relay gold in a Championship record. He followed that up with double gold (200m Freestyle, 4 × 200 m Freestyle) at his second European Junior Championships in Poznan.

He made his senior international debut at the 2013 World Aquatics Championships in Barcelona, lowering his British Age Group record (17 yrs) to finish fifth in the 400m Freestyle, then setting another British Age Group record (17 yrs) as the lead-off in the 4 × 200 m Freestyle Relay as the British quartet finished seventh. James became the European and World Junior Champion in the 4x200 and holds the Word Junior Record in those Events.

2014–15 - Emergence and World titles
He came to senior prominence in 2014, Guy laid down a signal of intent with a hat-trick of golds at the British Gas Swimming Championships, taking the touch in the 200m Free, 400m Free and 200m Fly, and breaking the British record in the 400m Free. He represented England at the 2014 Commonwealth Games, winning two relay medals, lowering the British record again to claim 400m Freestyle bronze for England. Thereafter, representing Great Britain, he took silver medals in the 400-metre freestyle at the FINA World Championships in both the short course (25 metre) and long course formats. On 4 August 2015, he won the 200-metre freestyle at the 2015 World Aquatics Championships, the first British swimmer to win the event in its history.

He competed for England in the 4x100-metre medley relay and the 400-metre freestyle events at the 2014 Commonwealth Games where he won a gold  and bronze medal respectively.

At the 200-metre freestyle event at the 2015 World Aquatics Championships, Guy won the gold medal beating Olympic silver medallist Sun Yang of China by six hundredths of a second.	

At the same event, Guy struck gold again in the 4 × 200 m freestyle relay. Team GB was third at the last take over, when Guy took over. He swam his 200 in a 1:44.7, the quickest time across the pool and securing Great Britain the gold medal for the first time at the worlds in this event.

2016 - Relay success in Olympics debut
At the Rio Olympics in 2016, Guy won silver in the 4x200m freestyle relay with Stephen Milne, Duncan Scott, and Dan Wallace, and a further silver in the 4x100m medley relay with Chris Walker-Hebborn, Adam Peaty and Duncan Scott. He came fourth in the individual 200m freestyle event.

2017 - World relay gold and transition to butterfly
In February 2017 Guy, alongside coach Jol Fincke, moved his training base to the National Centre for Swimming at the University of Bath.

At the 2017 World Aquatics Championships. Guy won gold in the 4x200m freestyle with Duncan Scott, Stephen Milne and Nick Grainger in a time of seven minutes 1.70 seconds.  He shared the 100m butterfly bronze with Joseph Schooling of Singapore, both recording a time of 50.83 seconds. In the 4x100m medley relay, he again won silver with the same Olympic line-up of Walker-Hebborn, Peaty and Scott.

2018 - Europeans, Commonwealth relay success and final 400m free
At the 2018 Commonwealth Games held at the Gold Coast, Australia, Guy was part of the teams that won silver in the 4x200m freestyle, the 4x100m freestyle, as well as in the 4x100m medley, finishing behind Australia in all three. He also won a silver in the 100m butterfly, and a bronze on 400m freestyle, after which he announced that he would no longer swim the 400 metre freestyle event in competition, focusing instead on the 100 metre butterfly.

At the 2018 European Championships, Guy swam the anchor leg in the 4 × 200 metre freestyle relay, and won the gold medal with Duncan Scott, Thomas Dean and Calum Jarvis. The following day he won a second gold as part of the team in the mixed 4 × 100m medley, then added a third in the final day of the competition by winning as part of the British team the men's 4 × 100 metre medley relay. Individually, he took the bronze medal in the 100 metres butterfly on the final night.

2019 - Further World Championships success
At the 2019 World Aquatics Championships held in Gwangju, South Korea, Guy won a bronze as part of the GB team in the 4 × 100 m mixed medley relay.

In the men's 4 × 100 metre medley relay, he was part of the team together with Adam Peaty, Duncan Scott and Luke Greenbank. They won the final in a European record time of three minutes, 28.10 seconds, and the win is Britain's first gold medal in the event at the World Championships.

2021 - European Championships and Olympic gold
At the European Championships held in Budapest in May 2021, Guy won three gold medals as part of the British team in the men's 4 x 100 m medley, mixed 4 × 100 metre medley, and mixed 4 × 200 metre freestyle relays. He also won two silvers in both the men's 4 × 100 metre and 4 × 200 metre freestyle relays, as well as an individual bronze in 100m butterfly.
 
At the Tokyo Olympics, Guy swam the second leg in the final of the men's 4 × 200 metre freestyle relay, and won his first Olympic gold with Tom Dean, Duncan Scott, and Matt Richards in a time of six minutes 58.58 seconds. He then won a second gold, swimming the butterfly leg in the mixed 4 × 100 metre medley relay, and set a world record time of 3 minutes 37.58 seconds together with  Kathleen Dawson, Adam Peaty, and Anna Hopkin.

Guy was appointed Member of the Order of the British Empire (MBE) in the 2022 New Year Honours for services to swimming.

2022
At the 2022 World Aquatics Championships held in Budapest, Guy won two bronzes as part of the team, in Men's 4 × 100 metre medley relay and Men's 4 × 200 metre freestyle relay.

See also
List of Commonwealth Games medallists in swimming (men)

References

External links
 
 
 
 
 
 
 
 
 
 

1995 births
Living people
Commonwealth Games gold medallists for England
Commonwealth Games silver medallists for England
Commonwealth Games bronze medallists for England
British male swimmers
Swimmers at the 2014 Commonwealth Games
Swimmers at the 2018 Commonwealth Games
Swimmers at the 2022 Commonwealth Games
Sportspeople from Bury, Greater Manchester
World Aquatics Championships medalists in swimming
Medalists at the FINA World Swimming Championships (25 m)
Swimmers at the 2016 Summer Olympics
Swimmers at the 2020 Summer Olympics
Olympic swimmers of Great Britain
Olympic silver medallists for Great Britain
Medalists at the 2016 Summer Olympics
Olympic silver medalists in swimming
Commonwealth Games medallists in swimming
People educated at Millfield
European Aquatics Championships medalists in swimming
Male butterfly swimmers
British male freestyle swimmers
Team Bath swimmers
Medalists at the 2020 Summer Olympics
Olympic gold medalists in swimming
Olympic gold medallists for Great Britain
Members of the Order of the British Empire
Medallists at the 2014 Commonwealth Games
Medallists at the 2018 Commonwealth Games
Medallists at the 2022 Commonwealth Games